Lawrence John Lumley Dundas, 2nd Marquess of Zetland,  (11 June 1876 – 6 February 1961), styled Lord Dundas until 1892 and Earl of Ronaldshay between 1892 and 1929, was a British Conservative politician. An expert on India, he served as Secretary of State for India in the late 1930s.

Background and education
Zetland, born in London, was the son of Lawrence Dundas, 1st Marquess of Zetland, and Lady Lillian, daughter of Richard Lumley, 9th Earl of Scarbrough. He was educated at Harrow School and Trinity College, Cambridge.  At Cambridge, he was a member of the University Pitt Club.

Political career

In 1900, Zetland became aide-de-camp to Lord Curzon, Viceroy of India. While working for Curzon in the British Raj, Zetland travelled widely through Asia, having experiences which would later inform his fictional and non-fictional writing.

Zetland was returned to Parliament for Hornsey in 1907, a seat he held until 1916. Much of his public career centred on British India. In September 1912, he was appointed (with Lord Islington, Herbert Fisher, Mr Justice Abdur Rahim, and others) as a member of the Royal Commission on the Public Services in India of 1912–1915. He was Governor of Bengal between 1917 and 1922 and Secretary of State for India between 1935 and 1940. Although a member of the Conservative Party, his belief was that Indians should be allowed to take ever-increasing responsibility for the government of the country, culminating in Dominion status (enjoyed by Canada, Australia, and other formerly self-governing parts of the British Empire).

Zetland played an important role in the protracted negotiations which led to the Government of India Act 1935, which began, subject to the implacable opposition of Winston Churchill and the "diehards" to anything that might imperil direct British rule over India, to implement those ideals.

Zetland was also an author: Rab Butler, who served as his Parliamentary Under-Secretary at the India Office, records that he asked how he could understand better his chief's thinking about the future of India and received the answer: "Read my books!" Zetland kept Butler, who had helped to pass the Government of India Act and had enjoyed great influence under Zetland's predecessor Samuel Hoare, at arm's length, requiring him to book an appointment in advance if he wanted to see him. Butler continued to serve under him for another two years, but devotes only a single paragraph to this period in his memoirs.

Zetland was ideally placed as Secretary of State for India to implement the new Act, although the two Viceroys with whom he served, Lords Willingdon and Linlithgow, were rather less idealistic than he. In the event, Willingdon and Linlithgow were proved right when the Congress Party won the 1937 Provincial elections, much to the dismay of Zetland. Zetland's term as Secretary of State — and the experiment with democracy represented by the 1935 Act — came to an end with Churchill's assumption of the Prime Ministership in 1940: Zetland then offered his resignation, feeling that his ideas and Churchill's regarding India were so different that "I could only end by becoming an embarrassment to him." Two months prior to this, on 13 March 1940, Zetland was one of four people shot at the Caxton Hall by Indian nationalist Udham Singh; former lieutenant governor of the Punjab, Michael O'Dwyer, was killed. Zetland suffered only bruising to his ribs (the bullet was found in his clothes) and was able to take his seat in the House of Lords five days later.

Zetland, who was known to favour good relations between the UK and Germany, was associated with the Anglo-German Fellowship during the late 1930s.

Zetland was sworn of the Privy Council in 1922 and made a Knight of the Garter in 1942. He also bore the Sword of State at the coronation of George VI in 1937 and was Lord Lieutenant of the North Riding of Yorkshire between 1945 and 1951. He was elected President of the Royal Geographical Society in 1922 and President of the Royal Asiatic Society of Great Britain and Ireland for 1928–31. From 1932 to 1945, he was chairman of the National Trust.

Family

Lord Zetland married Cicely, daughter of Mervyn Henry Archdale, on 3 December 1907 and lived at Snelsmore at Chieveley in Berkshire. Zetland died in February 1961, aged 84, and was succeeded by his son, Lawrence Dundas, 3rd Marquess of Zetland. The Marchioness of Zetland died in January 1973. They had five children:
Lawrence Aldred Mervyn Dundas, 3rd Marquess of Zetland (b. 12 November 1908 - d. 5 October 1989)
Lady Viola Mary Dundas (4 January 1910 - d. 21 March 1995)
Lady Lavinia Margaret Dundas (b. 31 December 1914 - d. 4 January 1974)
Lady Jean Agatha Dundas (b. 4 May 1916 - d. 13 May 1995) married on 2 September 1939 to Hector Lorenzo Christie.
Lord Bruce Thomas Dundas (b. 18 October 1920 - d. 24 February 1942), killed on active service.

Publications 
A Wandering Student in the Far East. 1904
Lands of the Thunderbolt: Sikhim, Chumbi & Bhutan. Houghton Mifflin Company, Boston, 1923
India: a Bird's-eye View. Constable, London, 1924
The heart of Âryâvarta; a study of the psychology of Indian unrest. Constable, London, 1925
The Life Of Lord Curzon. (3 vols). Ernest Benn Ltd, London, 1928
Essayez: The Memoirs of Lawrence. John Murray, London, 1956

Notes

Book 
 Jago, Michael Rab Butler: The Best Prime Minister We Never Had?, Biteback Publishing 2015

References 
Bibliography
Zetland Estates

External links

1876 births
1961 deaths
People from Chieveley
People educated at Harrow School
Alumni of Trinity College, Cambridge
British governors of Bengal
Knights Grand Commander of the Order of the Indian Empire
Knights Grand Commander of the Order of the Star of India
Knights of the Garter
Lord-Lieutenants of the North Riding of Yorkshire
Members of the Privy Council of the United Kingdom
Secretaries of State for India
Dundas, Lawrence
Dundas, Lawrence
Dundas, Lawrence
Dundas, Lawrence
Zetland, M2
Knights of Justice of the Order of St John
Foreign Office personnel of World War II
Fellows of the British Academy
Marquesses of Zetland
Presidents of the Royal Asiatic Society
Presidents of the Royal Geographical Society
Ministers in the Chamberlain wartime government, 1939–1940
Ministers in the Chamberlain peacetime government, 1937–1939